Nordmannsjøkelen is a glacier in the municipalities of Alta and Hammerfest in Troms og Finnmark county, Norway. It is located at the island of Seiland, and is included in the Seiland National Park. The glacier surrounds the mountain of Seilandstuva, which is the highest peak of the island, and the highest peak in Hammerfest.

References

Glaciers of Troms og Finnmark
Alta, Norway
Hammerfest